Egzon Belica (born 3 September 1990) is a Macedonian-Albanian professional footballer who plays as a defender for Albanian club Partizani Tirana in the Albanian Superliga.

Club career

Partizani Tirana
In the first days of January 2018, Belica joined Albanian club Partizani Tirana on a 10-day trial in Antalya, Turkey. He successfully passed the trial, and on 23 January was presented as Partizani's newest player, penning an 18-month contract and taking squad number 2 for the second part of 2017–18 season. He played his first match for the club three days later, starting in a 1–0 away loss to Flamurtari Vlorë in championship matchday 17. Belica scored his first Albanian Superliga goal later 28 February, netting the third in Partizani's 6–0 hammering of bottom side Lushnja. Ultimately he managed to play in 19 league matches, all of them full-90 minutes, as Partizani managed a fifth-place finish; he also played two cup matches as Partizani was knocked-out in quarter-final by Flamurtari Vlorë in away goal rule. On 31 May, Belica's performances were rewarded as he was offered a contract extension by the club, which he accepted, with the contract reportedly containing 20% wage increase.

References

External links

FSHF profile

1990 births
Living people
Sportspeople from Struga
Albanian footballers from North Macedonia
Association football defenders
Macedonian footballers
FK Rabotnički players
FK Ohrid players
CS Concordia Chiajna players
KF Shkëndija players
FC Inter Turku players
Riga FC players
FK Partizani Tirana players
Macedonian First Football League players
Liga I players
Veikkausliiga players
Latvian Higher League players
Kategoria Superiore players
Macedonian expatriate footballers
Expatriate footballers in Romania
Macedonian expatriate sportspeople in Romania
Expatriate footballers in Finland
Macedonian expatriate sportspeople in Finland
Expatriate footballers in Latvia
Macedonian expatriate sportspeople in Latvia
Expatriate footballers in Albania
Macedonian expatriate sportspeople in Albania